Saint Theodore may refer to:

People
St. Theodore (died 130), companion of St. Pausilippus
St. Theodore of Perge (died 220), see Theodore, Philippa and companions
St. Theodore the Martyr
St. Theodore of Amasea or St. Theodore Tyron (died 306), military saint
St. Theodore of Heraclea or St. Theodore Stratelates (281-319), military saint
St. Theodorus of Tabennese (c. 314–368), disciple of Saint Pachomius
Mar Theodore of Mopsuestia (c. 350–428),  Christian theologian, and Bishop of Mopsuestia
St. Theodore of Octodurum or St. Yoder (4th century), bishop of Octodurum
St. Theodore of Vienne (died c. 575), Christian monk, abbot and hermit
St. Theodore of Marseille (died 594), persecuted bishop
St. Theodore of Sykeon (died 613), Byzantine ascetic
St. Theodore of Tarsus (602–690), archbishop of Canterbury
St. Theodore of Pavia (died 778), bishop
 St. Theodore (died 820), Orthodox monk
St. Theodore the Studite (759–826), monk, opponent of iconoclasm, and hymnographer
St. Theodorus, (ca. 775–ca. 842), see Theodorus and Theophanes
St. Theodore of Komogovo (died 1788), Serbian Orthodox saint 
St. Théodore Guérin (1798–1856), French nun who died in Indiana

Places
Theotokos of St. Theodore, an icon named after Theodore Stratelates
Saint-Théodore-d'Acton, Quebec, a small parish in Acton Regional County Municipality, Quebec, Canada

See also
 Agioi Theodoroi (disambiguation)
 Saint Theodora (disambiguation)
 San Teodoro (disambiguation)
 Teodor
 Theodore (disambiguation)
 Theodore (name)

Theodore